Dirk Fock (19 June 1858 – 17 October 1941) was a Dutch politician and diplomat of the defunct Liberal State Party (LSP) now merged into the People's Party for Freedom and Democracy (VVD). He served as Governor of Suriname (1908–1911), Speaker of the House of Representatives (1917–1921) and Governor-General of the Dutch East Indies (1921–1926).

Biography 
Fock was born on 19 June 1858 in Wijk bij Duurstede. After attending Gymnasium Haganum, Fock studied law at Leiden University from 1875 to 1880. After graduating, Fock went to the Dutch East Indies (now: Indonesia) were he worked as a lawyer and prosecutor in Batavia until 1898.

In 1899, Fock returned to the Netherlands and started practising law in Rotterdam. On 17 September 1901, he was first elected to the States General of the Netherlands for the Liberal State Party. On 17 August 1905, he was appointed Minister of Colonial Affairs in the De Meester cabinet. During his tenure, he enhanced and extended education in the colonies, and served until 12 February 1908.

On 10 Augustus 1908, Fock was appointed Governor-General of Suriname. During his tenure, he tried to stimulate the economy by developing the banana industry. There was increased immigration of indentured workers from British India and Java. Plans to further develop the healthcare and educational system were blocked by the States General. He served until 1 July 1911.

In 1913, Fock was re-elected to the States General, and became the Speaker of the House of Representatives in 1917. On 3 April 1919, he temporarily resigned from the States General, after Governor van Limburg Stirum of the Dutch East Indies pleaded for radical changes in the colony which was at odds with Fock's view of a gentle evolution. On 14 October 1920, he permanently resigned.

On 24 March 1921, Fock was appointed Governor-General of the Dutch East Indies succeeding his former adversary van Limburg Stirum. He arrived in the colony during a severe financial crisis, and the books were finally balanced in 1925. In 1923, he passed article 161bis of the Criminal Law, which criminalised incitements of strikes. In 1925, he passed the Wet op de Staatsinrichting (Constitutional Act) which allowed the Dutch East Indies to pass internal legislation without the approval of the States General. He served until 6 September 1926.

On 17 September 1929, Fock was elected to the Senate, and became Parliamentary leader on 20 September 1932. He retired on 17 September 1935. In 1930, he was a member of the Dutch delegation to the League of Nations and in 1931, he was in charge of creating the Dutch pavilion of the Paris Colonial Exposition.

Fock died on 17 October 1941 in The Hague, at the age of 83.

Honours 
  Knight Grand Cross of the Order of the Netherlands Lion.
  Knight Grand Cross of the Legion of Honour.
  Knight Grass Cross of the Order of the Crown.

References

External links 

1858 births
1941 deaths
Dutch expatriates in Indonesia
Dutch jurists
Governors of Suriname
Governors-General of the Dutch East Indies
Leiden University alumni
Liberal State Party politicians
Liberal Union (Netherlands) politicians
Ministers of Colonial Affairs of the Netherlands
Ministers of State (Netherlands)
Members of the Senate (Netherlands)
Members of the House of Representatives (Netherlands)
Members of the Provincial Council of South Holland
Speakers of the House of Representatives (Netherlands)
Recipients of the Order of the Netherlands Lion
People from Wijk bij Duurstede
Politicians from The Hague
20th-century Dutch civil servants
20th-century Dutch diplomats
20th-century Dutch East Indies people
20th-century Dutch lawyers
20th-century Dutch politicians
Grand Croix of the Légion d'honneur